Roberto Pacheco (born 21 February 1952) is a Puerto Rican judoka. He competed in the men's lightweight event at the 1972 Summer Olympics.

References

1952 births
Living people
Puerto Rican male judoka
Olympic judoka of Puerto Rico
Judoka at the 1972 Summer Olympics
Place of birth missing (living people)